Harischandra Devram Chavan (born 25 December 1951 Pratapgad District Nashik) is a member of the 15th Lok Sabha of India. He represents Dindori constituency in Maharashtra and is a member of the Bharatiya Janata Party (BJP) political party. 
He was also member of the 14th Lok Sabha of India and represented Malegaon constituency in Maharashtra.

References

Living people
1951 births
Bharatiya Janata Party politicians from Maharashtra
India MPs 2004–2009
India MPs 2009–2014
Marathi politicians
Lok Sabha members from Maharashtra
India MPs 2014–2019
People from Nashik district
Maharashtra MLAs 1995–1999